Dallinidae(Dallinidae Beecher) is a family of loopbearing brachiopods belonging to the order Terebratulida.

It is bilaterally symmetrical with a calcite tissue structure. It utilizes a feeding current for obtaining food and reproduces sexually. Occurrences have been observed around the globe, especially in Norway and Tasmania.

Genera

Genera:
 †Antigoniarcula Elliott, 1959
 Campages Hedley, 1905
 Dallina Beecher, 1893
 Jaffaia Thomson, 1927
 Nipponithyris Yabe & Hatai, 1934

References

Terebratulida
Brachiopod families